BORR may refer to:
Bunbury Outer Ring Road
Butterworth Outer Ring Road

See also
Borr